Richard Dowling or Dick Dowling may refer to:

Richard W. Dowling (1838–1867), commander at the Second Battle of Sabine Pass in the American Civil War
Dick Dowling (born 1938), Irish Fine Gael politician, former TD and senator
Richard Dowling (writer) (1846–1898), Irish novelist